The Hispano-Bretón is a Spanish breed of horse developed by crossing native Pura Raza Española horses with imported Breton draught horses. The breed is found mainly in two separate areas of northern Spain: Castile and León and parts of neighboring Cantabria; and the Pyrenees of Catalonia. The Hispano-Bretón is listed in the Catálogo Oficial de Razas de Ganado de España in the group of autochthonous breeds in danger of extinction.

See also
Iberian horse

References

Further reading 

 M.D. Gómez, P.J. Azor, M.E. Alonso, J. Jordana, M. Valera (2012). Morphological and genetic characterization of Spanish heavy horse breeds: Implications for their conservation. Livestock Science. 144 (1–2): 57–66. . .

Horse breeds
Horse breeds originating in Spain